École de Gaulle-Adenauer or École française de Gaulle-Adenauer (EFDGA), formerly the Lycée Français de Gaulle-Adenauer, is a French international school in , Bonn, Germany. As of 2015 it has 176 students, including 75 école maternelle (preschool) students and 101 primary students.

History
It was established in 1950, with collège lower secondary classes beginning in 1961 and Baccalauréat classes established as of 1984. The AEFE began contracting with the school in 1990. That year the school received the name "Lycée de Gaulle-Adenauer," after Charles de Gaulle and Konrad Adenauer.

In 2008 the school moved to a temporary site at Domhofstraße during a renovation and expansion of its buildings. It moved back to its current location on Meckenheimer Straße in 2010.

See also
 La Gazette de Berlin
German international schools in France:
 Internationale Deutsche Schule Paris
 DFG / LFA Buc
 Deutsche Schule Toulouse

Alumni 

 Édouard Philippe, former Prime Minister of France

External links
 
 École de Gaulle-Adenauer 
 École de Gaulle-Adenauer

Notes

French international schools in Germany
Secondary schools in Germany
International schools in North Rhine–Westphalia
Schools in Bonn
Educational institutions established in 1950
1950 establishments in Germany
Charles de Gaulle
Konrad Adenauer